Abaca bunchy top virus (ABTV) is a pathogenic plant virus of the family Nanoviridae. ABTV has been isolated from both abacá (Musa textilis) and banana (Musa sp.). ABTV has many similarities to banana bunchy top virus (BBTV) but is both genetically and serologically distinct in that it lacks two open reading frames found in BBTV's genome. ATBV's genome contains six circular components, each of which are 1,000-1,500 base pairs in length.



Spread

Resistance
In 2009, University of the Philippines Los Baños researchers funded by the Department of Agriculture developed an abacá variety that is resistant to the ABTV. The university is working further to make it resistant to mosaic and abacá bract mosaic viruses.

References

Banana diseases
Viral plant pathogens and diseases
Nanoviridae